The Fairview Avenue North Bridge is a road bridge in the Eastlake neighborhood of Seattle, Washington, United States, crossing a shallow arm of Lake Union. The original timber-pile bridge was built in 1948 and expanded with a concrete span in 1963. Both bridges were replaced by a new span that opened in 2021.

History
The roadway relied on a once often used, but now outdated, construction atop a timber pier. The original span was built in 1948, with a parallel crossing completed in 1963. The crossing was closed in 2019 with a plan to reconstruct the road in 2020. The new bridge opened in July 2021.

References

External links
 

Bridges in Seattle
Road bridges in Washington (state)
Eastlake, Seattle